The Prix France Culture/Télérama is a literary prize created in 2006 by the French radio station France Culture and the French magazine Télérama in order to honor an outstanding book at the start of the calendar year, which differentiates it from other famous French literary prizes such as the Prix Goncourt or the Prix Femina, which reward books appearing at the beginning of the academic year in September.

This award goes to a work of fiction written in French and published in January or February.  The president of the jury presents the author with a sum of 5,000 euros at the 
.

Winners

References

External links 
 The prize on the website for France Culture

France Culture Telerama
French fiction awards
Awards established in 2006